TT, Tt, tt, or .tt may refer to:

Biology and medicine
 Tetanus toxoid, a vaccine to prevent tetanus
 Therapeutic touch, an alternative medicine practice
 Thrombin time, a coagulation blood test

Business and organizations 
 TT Electronics, a British maker of automotive components
Tom Tailor, a German clothing company
 TT-Line Company, a ferry company operating the Spirit of Tasmania service
 TT Games, a British software producer
 TT News Agency, a Swedish news agency
 TT Technologies, a construction equipment manufacturer
 ThunderTalk Gaming, a Chinese esports organization
 Tigerair Australia's IATA code
 Toytown Germany, a web site for English-speaking foreigners in Germany

Computing
 .tt, the country code top-level domain for Trinidad and Tobago
 Template Toolkit, a Perl template engine
 Transaction translator, a particular unit in USB hubs
 tt-reduction or truth-table reduction, a kind of transformation used in computability theory
  (short for teletype), an HTML presentation element that writes text in monospace font

Gaming 
 Manx TT Super Bike, an arcade racing game by Sega
 Tourist Trophy (video game), a motorcycle racing game for the PlayStation 2
 Toontown Online, massively multiplayer online role-playing game by Disney, commonly known as Toontown

Music
 "TT" (song), a song by Twice
 Theresa Wayman or TT, musician
 Tritone, the musical interval of an augmented fourth or diminished fifth

Sports 
 Table tennis
 Time trial, in racing sports, a race against the clock to secure the fastest time
 TT Pro League, a professional association football league for clubs in Trinidad and Tobago

Motorcycle races 
 Isle of Man TT, an annual motor-cycle racing event held on the Isle of Man
 TT Zero, an Isle of Man TT race for solo motorcycles producing low-emissions
 Dutch TT, a motorcycling event, held on the last Saturday of June
 Welsh TT, historic motorcycle road races originally held annually on Pendine Sands, Wales, UK circa 1920
 Welsh TT, historic motorcycle road races originally held annually at Mynydd Epynt, Wales, UK circa 1950

Other uses 
 Audi TT, a 2-door sports car produced by Audi
 TT earthing system (terre-terre), a system of electrical earthing
 TT pistol, a Soviet military automatic pistol designed by Fedor Tokarev
 TT scale, a niche model railroading scale
 Tatar language's ISO 639-1 code
 Telegraphic transfer or T/T, a method of transferring money
 Terrestrial Time, an astronomical time standard
 Tiny Telephone, a type of phone connector
 Trinidad and Tobago's ISO 3166 digram
 Trust Territory, a former geopolitical status
 TT, the production code for the 1968 Doctor Who serial The Dominators
 T.T., a fictional character in The Forever Purge
 TT bar, a ten tola gold bar
 Thomas Thorpe, the publisher of Shakespeare's sonnets
 Theban Tombs, discovered tombs of the Theban Necropolis
 TT, an emoticon indicating tears streaming from the eyes
Time Team, a British television series

See also 
 Atari TT030, a computer based on the Motorola 68030 CPU
 Pi (letter) or Π
 TTT (disambiguation)
 2T (disambiguation)
 T2 (disambiguation)
 T-square (disambiguation)
 Tourist Trophy (disambiguation)